The 2018 Florida Commissioner of Agriculture election occurred on November 6, 2018, to elect the Florida Commissioner of Agriculture. Incumbent Republican Commissioner of Agriculture Adam Putnam was term-limited and could not seek re-election to a third consecutive term. Democrat Nikki Fried narrowly defeated Republican Matt Caldwell. Fried became the only statewide elected Democrat in Florida, as U.S. Senator Bill Nelson, who had held Florida's Class I U.S. Senate seat since 2000, lost reelection. As of 2023, this remains the last time that a Democrat has won a statewide election in Florida, and the only time since 2012.

Republican primary

Candidates

Declared
 Matt Caldwell, state representative
 Denise Grimsley, state senator
 Mike McCalister, retired United States Army colonel, Republican candidate for governor in 2010, Republican candidate for U.S. Senate in 2012
 Baxter Troutman, former state representative

Withdrawn
Paul Paulson, businessman, 2015 candidate for Mayor of Orlando

Declined
 Ben Albritton, state representative
 Halsey Beshears, state representative
 Lisa Carlton, former state senator
 Steve Crisafulli, former Speaker of the Florida House of Representatives
 Greg Steube, state senator

Endorsements

Polling

Results

Democratic primary

Candidates

Declared
Jeff Porter, mayor of Homestead
R. David Walker, president of the South Florida Audubon Society
Nikki Fried, lobbyist attorney

Withdrawn
Michael Christine, University of Miami School of Law student
Daniel Sohn, Palm Beach County Soil and Water Conservation District aide
Thomas Clayton White Jr., Florida Agricultural & Mechanical University chemistry professor

Declined
Katie Edwards-Walpole, state representative
Patrick Murphy, former U.S. Congressman, Democratic nominee for U.S. Senate in 2016

Endorsements

Results

General election

Polling

With Grimsley

With Troutman

Results

See also
 Florida Commissioner of Agriculture

References

External links
Official campaign websites
Matt Caldwell (R) for Agriculture Commissioner
Nikki Fried (D) for Agriculture Commissioner

Commissioner of Agriculture
Florida Commissioner of Agriculture
Florida Commissioner of Agriculture elections